Stephen Lewis Williams (born July 28, 1981), better known by his stage name Stevie Stone, is an American rapper from Columbia, Missouri. He was signed to Tech N9ne's Strange Music record label from 2011 to 2021 and has since founded his own record label Ahdasee Records. He has released seven studio albums including Black Lion, with his most recent being Raising The Bar in April 2022.

Career 
Stone grew up in Columbia, Missouri, and is based in St. Louis. He discovered a love of music through his mother, a singer and choir director who introduced the rapper to gospel, blues, and soul at an early age. As he grew up, Stone had his feet in the worlds of music and sports, pursuing a basketball career and playing piano and drums. Though he received an offer to play ball for a junior college in Iowa, he was asked to open at a show just weeks before he would leave for school, and he chose to focus on his rap career. In 2007, Stone signed with Ruthless Records, which released his debut, New Kid Coming, on September 29, 2009. Not long afterwards, the MC left the label to sign with Tech N9ne's Strange Music. On June 12, 2012, his second studio album Rollin' Stone was released. On October 23, 2012, he released an EP titled Momentum. On August 13, 2013, his third studio album 2 Birds 1 Stone was released. 
In 2021, Stevie Stone announced across social media platforms that he has officially departed Strange Music and has since announced Ahdasee Records as his new record label with the release of his first independent single since 2009 titled "Jumping Out The Window".

Discography

Studio albums

Extended plays

Mixtapes

Singles

Guest appearances

References

1981 births
Living people
African-American male rappers
Ruthless Records artists
Rappers from Columbia, Missouri
Rappers from St. Louis
21st-century American rappers
21st-century American male musicians
21st-century African-American musicians
20th-century African-American people